The 1982 CONCACAF Under-20 Championship was held in Guatemala. It also served as qualification for the 1983 FIFA World Youth Championship.

Teams
The following teams entered the tournament:

Round 1

Group 1

Group 2

Group 3

Round 2

Group A

Group B

Semifinals

Third place match

Final

Qualification to World Youth Championship
Two teams qualified directly for the 1983 FIFA World Youth Championship.

  (host)
  (losing finalists, replacing Honduras who were disqualified)

The third placed Costa Rica had to play an additional intercontinental qualification in 1983, but failed to qualify. All matches were played in Costa Rica and Australia qualified for the World Youth Championship.

External links
Results by RSSSF

CONCACAF Under-20 Championship
1982 in youth association football